Carl Henriquez (born 8 August 1979) is an Aruban weightlifter. He competed at the 2012 Summer Olympics in the +105 kg event.

References

Aruban male weightlifters
Olympic weightlifters of Aruba
Weightlifters at the 2012 Summer Olympics
Pan American Games competitors for Aruba
Weightlifters at the 1999 Pan American Games
1979 births
Living people